Beauty and the Beat is the debut album from Californian new wave band the Go-Go's. Released in 1981 on the I.R.S. Records label, the album reached number one on Billboard's Top LPs & Tape chart in March 1982, bolstered by its two big Hot 100 hit singles: "Our Lips Are Sealed" (no. 20) and "We Got the Beat" (no. 2), initially released in 1980, but in a different version. After a long and steady climb, Beauty and the Beat reached number one in the album chart dated March 6, 1982, the week before "We Got the Beat" entered the Top Ten of the Hot 100. The album stayed at the top for six consecutive weeks, and ranked second in Billboard'''s year-end Top 100 of 1982 (behind the self-titled debut album of Asia). The LP sold in excess of two million copies, and was RIAA-certified double platinum, qualifying it as one of the most successful debut albums of all time. Critically acclaimed, it has been described as one of the "cornerstone albums of American new wave".

The title is a play on the European fairy tale "Beauty and the Beast".

Background
In the late 1970s, Belinda Carlisle, Jane Wiedlin, and Margot Olavarria met while attending punk rock shows in California. The three attended the Sex Pistols' final performance in San Francisco in January 1978, and afterwards were inspired to form their own band. Although none of them actually knew how to play instruments, they quickly learned, and began playing in Hollywood nightclubs under the name the Go-Go's. Carlisle was the singer, Wiedlin played rhythm guitar, Olavarria played bass and the newly added Elissa Bello played drums. A few months later, Charlotte Caffey joined the band as the lead guitarist since she had experience writing music with other groups like the Eyes. The Go-Go's developed a reputation within the Hollywood punk scene and were invited to open for the band Madness on a UK tour. While on tour, the Go-Go's recorded an extended play for Stiff Records.

Tensions between band members resulted in Bello and Olavarria leaving the Go-Go's and they were replaced by drummer Gina Schock and bassist Kathy Valentine. Around this time, the Go-Go's began to move toward a more pop rock-driven sound, influenced by the burgeoning new wave genre. Although their reputation continued to grow, they were unable to attract attention from major record labels. At a special showcase for A&R representatives at the Starwood, the Go-Go's didn’t get a single offer. Carlisle believes this was because record executives were sexist and did not want to sign an all-female band. The only label that expressed interest was the indie label I.R.S. Records. In a 1982 Rolling Stone interview, Valentine said: "IRS was where you went if you couldn't get a deal with a real label." On April 1, 1981, I.R.S. cofounder Miles Copeland III signed the Go-Go's.

In the Go-Go's documentary, Carlisle claimed to have come up with the idea for the album cover, saying she wanted something "timeless" and "incognito." The towels the band used for the shoot were returned to the Macy's they were bought from earlier that day. Initially the album was released with a peach colored cover but the band was displeased with the look and later pressings were released with a blue cover. 

 Reception Beauty and the Beat was released to reviews that, while positive, were not outstanding, especially in light of its eventual summit of the album charts. Robert Christgau found the album good and wrote "this one's got hooks" in his column in The Village Voice, while Jon Pareles in Rolling Stone called it a "solid, likable debut". The album placed 10th on the annual Pazz & Jop critics' poll in The Village Voice for 1981.

The album has since gained in regard. AllMusic editor Stephen Thomas Erlewine called Beauty and the Beat "one of the cornerstone albums of new wave" and praised its "catchy hooks and an exuberant sense of fun", while Rolling Stone's Warren Zanes wrote that the band "showed that elemental pop rock & roll remained as viable as ever."

Eric Allen of American Songwriter, reviewing the album's 2011 deluxe edition, wrote that Beauty and the Beat is "one of the 1980s cornerstone albums of American new wave" and "still holds up surprisingly well thirty years later, which is a testament to the energetic spirit captured in this musical Zeitgeist of the 80s"; on the other hand, it is also "a reminder that the Go-Go's were never able to equal or surpass the success of this landmark debut".

NPR Musics Hilary Hughes credited the quintet with perfecting pop-punk's formula through the album. Though she saw that bands like Blondie and the Ramones showed that pop and punk music "[weren't] mortal enemies", she claimed that the Go-Go's showed the "certifiable success" of the two's fusion.Classic Rock History critic Emily Fagen rated 4 songs on the album as being among the Go-Go's best – the two hit singles plus "Lust to Love" and "How Much More".

"When I was about seven, I discovered the Go-Go's," said American actress and author Drew Barrymore in an essay published by the magazine V. "I went out and bought their album Beauty and the Beat and, as the vinyl twirled, my whole world changed. I stared at the girls on the cover like they were a gateway to cool. The fact that they were girls made me feel not only invited but more important – like I could be a badass too. I looked over to my Pippi Longstocking poster on the wall and thought, Yes! I like girls who rock!"

 Legacy 
In 2003, Beauty and the Beat was ranked number 413 on Rolling Stones list of the 500 greatest albums of all time, and it later placed on updates of the list at number 414 (in 2012) and at number 400 (in 2020). The album opener, "Our Lips Are Sealed", has been covered over the years by numerous artists, and remains a staple of 1980s playlists. It has been cited in numerous lists of the greatest songs, including Rolling Stones 2000 list of the 100 greatest pop songs. "We Got the Beat" was named one of the "500 Songs That Shaped Rock and Roll" by the Rock and Roll Hall of Fame.

Capitol and I.R.S. released a 30th anniversary deluxe edition of Beauty and the Beat digitally and on CD on May 17, 2011. Disc one features the remastered original album while disc two contains an entire live show, recorded at the Metro Club in Boston on August 20, 1981. Both Vacation (1982) and Talk Show'' (1984) were previously issued in remastered CD form in 1999.

In 2016, Edsel Records reissued remastered deluxe editions, all with bonus tracks, of the Go-Go's original three releases.

Track listing

Personnel

Band members
 Belinda Carlisle – lead vocals
 Charlotte Caffey – lead guitar, keyboards, backing vocals
 Gina Schock – drums, percussion
 Kathy Valentine – bass guitar, guitar backing vocals
 Jane Wiedlin – rhythm guitar, backing vocals, lead vocals on the "Our Lips are Sealed" bridge

Production
 Richard Gottehrer – producer
 Rob Freeman – producer, engineer, and mixing
 James A. Ball – assistant engineer and mixing assistant
 Ted Blechta, Darroll Gustamachio, Gray Russell, John Terelle – assistant engineers
 Stuart Furusho, David Leonard – mixing assistants
 Doug Schwartz – remixing
 Greg Calbi – mastering
 Ginger Canzoneri, Mike Doud, Mick Haggerty, Vartan – art direction
 Mike Fink, Mick Haggerty – design
 George DuBose, Mick Haggerty, Cindy Marsh – photography
 Cindy Marsh – illustrations

Charts

Album

Singles

Certifications

Accolades

References

External links

Beauty and the Beat (Adobe Flash) at Radio3Net (streamed copy where licensed)

The Go-Go's albums
1981 debut albums
I.R.S. Records albums
Illegal Records albums
Columbia Records albums
Epic Records albums
Albums produced by Richard Gottehrer